Zimmer's woodcreeper (Dendroplex kienerii) is a species of bird in the woodcreeper subfamily (Dendrocolaptinae). Its genus, Dendroplex, was recently confirmed to be distinct from Xiphorhynchus. 
It mainly occurs in Brazil's Amazon basin as well as in adjacent border areas of northeast Peru and southeast Colombia.
Its natural habitat is Várzea.

References

Zimmer's woodcreeper
Birds of the Amazon Basin
Zimmer's woodcreeper
Zimmer's woodcreeper
Taxonomy articles created by Polbot